Arapakkam is a village in the Kanchipuram district of Tamil Nadu, India. According to the 2011 census of India, it has a population of 2937.

History 

The Arapakkam inscription, dated to the fifth regnal year of the Chola ruler Rajadhiraja II (r. c. 1166–1178), states that a Chola chieftain had granted the village to a religious leader named Umapati-deva (also known as Jnana-Siva and Svamidevar). The inscription states that Umapati-deva was a native of the Dakṣina Rāḍha (present-day West Bengal), and had migrated to the  southern Chola kingdom. Around this time, the Sinhala army captured the neighbouring Pandya kingdom, and then began offensives against the Chola feudatories. The Chola chieftain Edirilisola Sambuvarayan appointed Umapati-deva to offer prayers and conduct worship rituals, in order to avert this crisis. After 28 days of worship, Sambuvarayan received a letter from the Chola general Pillai Pallavarayan, informing him that the Sinhala generals Jayadratha, Lankapuri and others had retreated. Believing that Umapati-deva had divine powers, Sambuvarayan granted him the village of Alpakkam (modern Arapakkam), comprising 167 velis of land, as a tax-free endowment.

References 

Villages in Kanchipuram district